Lewis Wing (born 23 June 1995) is an English professional footballer who plays for Wycombe Wanderers, as an attacking midfielder.

Club career

Early career
Born in Newton Aycliffe, County Durham, Wing attended Woodham Comprehensive School followed by Durham Sixth Form Centre where he studied Sports Science. He started playing football from the age of five for Newton Aycliffe Sports Club going on to play for Norton & Stockton Ancients as a junior. Wing later ended up in the youth system of Darlington until he was released at the age of 14 for "being too small". Wing quit playing football for two years following his release by Darlington, instead he focused on getting his golf handicap down to five until he was invited to play for local Sunday league side Newton Aycliffe Working Men's Club who were at the time managed by his cousin Jason Steele.

While playing Sunday league football and still at college, Wing was scouted by Northern League side Brandon United who he made his senior debut for at the age of 16. He combined playing football and his studies with employment at a branch of Tesco in Newton Aycliffe in the evenings. Wing then played for his home town club Newton Aycliffe, before in September 2012 he joined Esh Winning. He eventually joined Northern League Division Two side Tow Law Town, where he established himself as a regular member of the first team for a couple of seasons.

On 3 January 2014, Wing left Tow Law Town to sign for fellow Northern League Division Two side Seaham Red Star. Wing made his debut for Seaham Red Star in a 2–1 victory against Heaton Stannington, on 5 January 2014. After two months with Seaham Red Star, Wing left to rejoin Darlington 1883 five years after they released him from their youth system. Wing made two appearances as a sub for Darlington before returning to Seaham Red Star. Having started the 2013–14 season back at Newton Aycliffe where he made five further league appearances, Wing rejoined Seaham Red Star for a third spell on 28 August 2014. Wing's performances helped inspire Seaham Red Star to win the Northern League Division Two title in 2015.

Having previously turned down a move to Spennymoor Town during the 2014–15 season, Wing signed for Northern League Division One side Shildon in June 2015. While he returned to Seaham Red Star on loan for eight weeks in November 2015, Wing's first season saw him score 11 goals in 42 appearances for Shildon, as the club won the Northern League Division One title, their first Northern League title since the 1930s.

Wing's second season with Shildon would turn out to be even more prolific as he netted 37 times for the Northern League outfit.

Middlesbrough
His performances for Shildon led to Wing being scouted by Championship side Middlesbrough, with whom he signed a pre-contract agreement in March 2017. The deal was confirmed on 28 June 2017, with Wing signing a one-year contract and linking up with the Middlesbrough under-23s team. On 24 August 2017, he made his debut for the club in the EFL Cup, coming on as a late substitute for Grant Leadbitter in a 3–0 win over Scunthorpe United at the Riverside Stadium. In November 2017, having played in one further EFL Cup match, Wing signed a contract extension with Middlesbrough to extend his stay until the end of the 2018–19 season.

Yeovil Town loan
On 5 January 2018, Wing joined League Two side Yeovil Town on loan until the end of the season. He made his debut in the FA Cup, coming on as a late substitute for Jared Bird in a 2–0 victory over Bradford City at Huish Park. Wing scored his first goal for the club on 20 January 2018 in a 1–2 loss to Chesterfield. He would go on to score two more goals and provide an assist in 22 total appearances for the club.

Return to Middlesbrough
Wing started his first league game for Middlesbrough on 7 August 2018, providing two assists in a 3–0 victory over Sheffield United. In October 2018, Wing extended his contract at the Middlesbrough until the end of the 2021-22 season.

Loan to Rotherham
On 1 February 2021, Wing joined Rotherham United on loan until the end of the 2020–21 season. He made his debut as a substitute in the 3–0 home victory against Derby County on 3 February 2021.

Loan to Sheffield Wednesday
On 27 July 2021, Wing joined Sheffield Wednesday on a season-long loan deal.  He would make his competitive debut on 1 August 2021, at home to Huddersfield Town in the EFL Cup. His first goal would come against Mansfield Town in the EFL Trophy on 5 October 2021.

Wycombe Wanderers
On 31 January 2022, Wing joined League One side Wycombe Wanderers on a permanent basis, on a 6 month contract. He scored his first two goals for the club in a 3-1 victory over Crewe Alexandra on 5 March.

Personal life
Wing is related to former Middlesbrough and current Brighton & Hove Albion goalkeeper Jason Steele.

Career statistics

References

1995 births
Living people
English footballers
Association football midfielders
Darlington F.C. players
Brandon United F.C. players
Newton Aycliffe F.C. players
Esh Winning F.C. players
Tow Law Town F.C. players
Seaham Red Star F.C. players
Shildon A.F.C. players
Middlesbrough F.C. players
Yeovil Town F.C. players
Rotherham United F.C. players
Sheffield Wednesday F.C. players
Wycombe Wanderers F.C. players
Northern Football League players
Northern Premier League players
English Football League players